Raja Ki Aayegi Baraat is an Indian television series which aired on Star Plus between 2008 and 2010. The show outlined the journey of Rani, who goes from being a servant of a palace to being the queen of Rajkumar Yudhistir. The serial was produced by Rashmi Sharma Telefilms for M-Net Original Production.

Plot
Raja Ki Aayegi Baraat is the journey of a Rani as she goes from a servant to the queen of the palace and how she manages the responsibilities of a queen and the elder daughter-in-law. After many obstacles, Rajkumar Yudhistir and Rani finally unite.

Rani gives birth to a daughter. Ira, a ghost, was in love with Rani's husband, Kuvar Yuddishter; she came as the baby's nanny. Rani comes in disguise of an old woman Bhoomi to find out about Ira. Bhoomi finds out that Ira's real name is Mohini and about how wicked she was in her past and her home, Bhavan-bitti-ki-kotri. Ira disables Bhoomi's speech so she can't tell anyone about her evilness. After a battle, Rani manages to win and Bhoomi gets back her speech.

Rani and Yudishter both die in a car accident, leaving their young daughter, Sandhya alone. At first, Sandhya was named Mohini but, upon realizing that Ira's real name was Mohini, they changed it. Mohini (Ira) curses Sandhiya as she dies, to seek revenge from Rani that her face becomes ugly at dusk. A new maid Sajili has come to their palace, only to steal. She has a thief son, Virendra/Viru. Viru along with his friend, Balma, pretends to be the prince Kuvar Veer to fool the royal family. Raja Sahib and Choti Rani plan a wedding with Viru and Sandhiya as they think her marriage with Virendra will break Mohini (Ira)'s spell. Rudra and Bhoomi are not shown. Kuvar Aryaman, Bhoomi and Rudhr's son, who is younger than Sandhiya, has put a man called Rajveer in Viru's place. Sandhiya has accepted her marriage with Rajveer. They both plan to seduce Sandhya.

Sandhya knows little that Aryaman and Rajveer are planning to ruin her life. They also created a duplicate Sandhya by cloning her by taking blood samples, hair, skin, nails etc. Later Aryaman and Rajveer apologise the royal family and Sandhya as well. The duplicate is said to be destroyed and Mohini's spell is recovered. Then the serial ends in a happy note as the whole cast re-assembles.

Cast
 Anjali Abrol as Rani Yudhishthir Sisodia
 Kapil Nirmal as Rajkumar Yudhishthir Sisodia
 Mrinal Kulkarni as Kalyani Sisodia (Choti Rani)
 Dimple Jhangiani as Sandhya 
 Pankaj Dheer as Mr. Sisodia (Raja Sahaab)
 Amit Dua as Kunwar Rudra 
 Kanika Maheshwari as Rajkumari Bhoomi
 Ravi Bhatia as Balma
 Arjun Mahajan as Veer
 Ali Merchant as Kunwar Angad
 Jyotsna Karyekar as Dadi
 Siddhartha Gupta as Munna
 Ali Hassan as Bhushan
 Kushal Punjabi as Neel
 Poonam Gulati as Amy
 Rishika Mihani as Ira 
 Guddi Maruti as Chachi / Chunderkaliah
 Iira Soni as Rajkumari Nandini 
 Anurag Prapanna as Chacha / Surdurion
 Nupur Alankar as Thumki Bua 
 Apara Mehta as Jhumki Bua 
 Upasana Singh as Bhanumati
 Divyajyotee Sharma as Kali
 Pallavi Subhash Chandran as Namki 
 Dishank Arora as Kuwar Aryamaan
 Anuradha as Badi Rani
 Zafar as Agni
 Prithvi Zutshi as Lawyer
 Raj Singh as Saksham
 Sunayana Fozdar as Niharika
 Via Chaudhary as Imli / Sona
 Mahesh Chandra Bhatt as Kidnapper
 Unknown as Mrityu
 Unknown as Rajveer
 Hina Khan as Akshara
 Puja Banerjee as Vrinda
 Giaa Manek as Gopi
 Rucha Hasabnis as Rashi
 Shweta Tiwari as Prerna
 Additi Gupta as Heer
 Ragini Khanna as Suhana
 Anupriya Kapoor as Tani
 Sara Khan as Sadhna
 Parul Chauhan as Ragini
 Pooja Gor as Pratigya

Production
In November 2008, the shootings and telecast of all the Hindi television series including this series and films were stalled on 8 November 2008 due to dispute by the technician workers of FWICE (Federation of Western India Cine Employees) for increasing the wages, better work conditions and more breaks between shootings. FWICE first took a strike on 1 October 2008 when they addressed their problems with the producers and production was stalled. A contract was signed after four days discussions and shooting were happening only for two hours content in a day then after which differences increased between them while channels gave them time until 30 October 2008 to sort it out. Failing to do so lead to protests again from 10 November 2008 to 19 November 2008 during which channels blacked out new broadcasts and repeat telecasts were shown from 10 November 2008. On 19 November 2008, the strike was called off after settling the disputes and the production resumed. The new episodes started to telecast from 1 December 2008.

Raja Ki Aayegi Baraat was replaced by the TV serial Maryada: Lekin Kab Tak? on 4 October 2010.

References

External links
 Raja Ki Aayegi Baraat official site

Indian television series
StarPlus original programming
2008 Indian television series debuts
2010 Indian television series endings